James Buchanan Henry (1833–1915) was a lawyer, writer, Secretary to the President of the United States, nephew and ward of James Buchanan. He was the first man to hold this office after it became an official, paid Government post. He held this position for two years.

J. B. Henry was the son of Harriet Buchanan (1802–1840) and the Reverend Robert Henry. At age seven, Henry was adopted by uncle James Buchanan and raised as his ward. Buchanan wanted his nephew to become an attorney like him, and paid for his admittance and education at Princeton in 1850. In 1851 he sent Henry to study law in Philadelphia with John Cadwalader.

Prior to Henry, each president paid the wages of his private secretaries out of his own pocket. Some of Henry's duties included drawing the President's salary and paying all of the bills. His post was in the office of the southeast corner room, second floor. He served there between the years 1857 to 1859.

After leaving the White House, he practised law in New York City, where he served as Assistant United States District Attorney.

Notes

1833 births
1915 deaths
Personal secretaries to the President of the United States
Lawyers from New York City
19th-century American lawyers